Liceo María Luisa Bombal is a Chilean high school located in Rancagua, Cachapoal Province, Chile.

References 

Educational institutions established in 1906
Secondary schools in Chile
Schools in Cachapoal Province
1906 establishments in Chile